Brucepattersonius guarani, also known as the Guaraní akodont or Guaraní brucie, is a South American rodent in the genus Brucepattersonius. It is known from a single specimen from Misiones Province in northeastern Argentina, at the southern end of the Atlantic Forest. The species is protected by Moconá Provincial Park but is threatened by deforestation in nearby areas.

References

Literature cited
Duff, A. and Lawson, A. 2004. Mammals of the World: A checklist. New Haven, Connecticut: Yale University Press, 312 pp. 

Patton, J.L., Pardiñas Ulyses F.J., D'Elia, G.. Mammals of South America, Volume 2: Rodents. University of Chicago Press. 2015. 214.

Mammals of Argentina
Brucepattersonius
Mammals described in 2000